King Harold may refer to:

Kings of England 
 Harold Harefoot (c. 1015–1040)
 Harold Godwinson (c. 1022–1066)

Kings of Denmark 
 Harald Bluetooth (935–985/986)
 Harald II of Denmark (c. 996–1018)
 Harald III of Denmark (1040–1080)

Kings of Norway 
 Harald Fairhair (850–933)
 Harald Greycloak (c. 935–970)
 Harald Hardrada (1015–1066)
 Harald Gille (c. 1102–1136)
 Harald V of Norway (born 1937)

Others 
 Harald I Olafsson (died 1248), King of Mann & the Hebrides
 King Harold (Shrek), fictional character in films

See also
 Harold I (disambiguation)
 Harold II (disambiguation)
 Harold III (disambiguation)
 Harold King (disambiguation)